Mangubhai Chhaganbhai Patel is an Indian statesman who is the current and 19th Governor of Madhya Pradesh. He is a leader of Bharatiya Janata Party from Gujarat. He served as the officiating speaker of the Gujarat Legislative Assembly in 2014. He has earlier served as a cabinet minister in the Government of Gujarat. Patel was elected to the assembly from Navsari constituency. He has been appointed 19th Governor of Madhya Pradesh on 6 July 2021 by the President of India.

Political career
Mangubhai is a Tribal Leader. He was elected MLA from Navsari constituency from 1990 to 2012 and from 2012 to 2017 from Gandevi Vidhansabha.
He was Cabinet Minister in Gujarat Government.
He was elected as Deputy Speaker of Gujarat Vidhansabha in October 2013. 
On 6 July 2021 , he was appointed Governor of Madhya Pradesh state by the President of India Ram Nath Kovind Ji.
He has earlier served as a cabinet minister in the Government of Gujarat. Patel was elected to the assembly from Navsari constituency. He has been appointed 19th Governor of Madhya Pradesh on 6 July 2021 by the President of India.

References

|-

Living people
Deputy Speakers of the Gujarat Legislative Assembly
Gujarat MLAs 2012–2017
People from Navsari district
State cabinet ministers of Gujarat
1944 births
Bharatiya Janata Party politicians from Gujarat
Governors of Madhya Pradesh